Ligand-dependent nuclear receptor-interacting factor 1 (LRIF1) also known as receptor-interacting factor 1 (RIF1) is a protein that in humans is encoded by the LRIF1 gene.

LRIF1 has been shown to interact with SMCHD1 protein, mutation of which causes facioscapulohumeral muscular dystrophy type 2 (FSHD2). Mutation of LRIF1 itself has also been implicated in FSHD2.

References

Further reading